Candy is a 1979 album by American musical group Con Funk Shun. Released on May 26, 1979 on the Mercury Records label, This album is the fifth album released by the Vallejo, California–based band.

Track listing
 Fire When Ready – 1:43 	
Chase Me – 5:39 	
Not Ready – 5:16 	
Da Lady – 3:51 	
Candy – 5:13 	
(Let Me Put) Love On Your Mind – 6:08 	
Main Slice – 4:11 	
Images – 2:40

Personnel
Michael Vernon Cooper – Lead Guitar, Rhythm Guitar, Electric Sitar, Percussion, Lead and Background Vocals
Louis A. McCall – Drums, Electronic Drums (Syn Drums), Percussion, Vocals
Felton C. Pilate – Trombone, Electric Piano, Synthesizer, Trumpet, Percussion, Lead Vocals
Karl Fuller – Trumpet, Flugelhorn, Trombone (Valve), Percussion, Vocals
Paul Harrell – Soprano Saxophone, Tenor Saxophone, Flute, Percussion, Vocals
Cedric Martin – Bass Guitar, Percussion, Lead Vocals
Danny A. Thomas – Clavinet, Organ, Electric Piano, Synthesizer, Percussion, Vocals
Skip Scarborough – Clavinet, Piano
Sheila Escovedo – Timbales
Jack Trotter, Michael Alexander  – Trumpet
Bill Summers  – Congas
Roger Glenn – Flute
Terry Adams – Concertmaster
Greg Blockman – MC

Charts

Singles

References

External links
 Con Funk Shun-Candy at Discogs

1979 albums
Con Funk Shun albums
Mercury Records albums